URF may refer to:

 Ultra Rapid Fire, a special game mode in League of Legends
 Unidentified reading frame, an open reading frame in DNA sequences
 Union of Right Forces, Russian liberal democratic political party (1999-2008)
 University Radio Falmer, student radio station for the University of Sussex
 University Research Fellowship of the Royal Society
 Urf, Arabic Islamic term referring to the custom, or 'knowledge', of a given society
 URF (Swedish Navy) or Ubåtsräddningsfarkosten, a Swedish submarine rescue vessel

eo:URF